Alphi was a car manufacturer in France from 1929 to 1931.  Only four cars were made.  

The name Alphi was short for Automobiles du Luart, Poniatowski, Hougardy, Ingėnieurs.   The three engineers set up their business in the rue de l'Universitė in the 7th arrondissement of Paris.

The first two cars sat on a  wheelbase and used a 6-cylinder side-valve 1485 cc C.I.M.E. engine.  They came with a stylish racing body incorporating two seats, positioned side by side.   One raced at the 1929 24 Hours of Le Mans, driven by Sosthènes de La Rochefoucauld but it retired during its 45th lap and never returned to the Le Mans circuit.  The other was supercharged in anticipation for the 1929 French Grand Prix (which that year was held at the Le Mans circuit on 30 June): however it was not ready in time for the race and did not participate.  It was notably heavy for the available power. 

The other two were touring cars, powered by Continental engines, one a 2.6-litre 6-cylinder and the other a 5.0-litre 8-cylinder. They had an independent rear suspension with transverse rear axles, and rigid front axles. 

Only two Alphis were surviving as of 1968; the supercharged race car and the 6-cylinder touring car.

References
 
 Georgano, G.N., "Alphi", in G.N. Georgano, ed., The Complete Encyclopedia of Motorcars 1885–1968  (New York: E.P. Dutton and Co., 1974), pp.37.

Defunct motor vehicle manufacturers of France
Manufacturing companies based in Paris
24 Hours of Le Mans race cars